The Grahame Clark Medal is awarded by the British Academy every two years "for academic achievement involving recent contributions to the study of prehistoric archaeology". It was endowed in 1992 by Sir Grahame Clark, an eminent prehistorian and archaeologist, and first awarded in 1993.

List of recipients
Source: British Academy
 1993: Stuart Piggott
 1995: John Coles
 1997: J. D. Clark
 1999: D. J. Mulvaney
 2002: John Wymer
 2004: Barrington W. Cunliffe
 2006: Geoffrey J. Wainwright
 2008: Paul Mellars
 2010: Richard Bradley
 2012: Charles Higham
 2014: Joan Oates, "to recognise her reputation as one of the leading authorities on Mesopotamian prehistory as well as her fundamental contributions to our understanding of ancient Near Eastern Civilisation."
 2016: Kristian Kristiansen, "for his contribution to the study of the European Bronze Age, and the management, protection and interpretation of archaeological heritage."
2018: Alison Sheridan, "for her outstanding research and wide-ranging contribution to the study of early prehistory."
 2020: Frances Healy

See also

 List of archaeology awards
 Awards of the British Academy

References

British awards
Academic awards
Archaeology awards
Awards established in 1992